Old St. Paul's is a 1914 British silent historical film directed by Wilfred Noy and starring Lionelle Howard, R. Juden and P.G. Ebbutt. It is based on the 1841 novel Old St. Paul's by Harrison Ainsworth. The film is set in London at the time of the Great Fire, and depicts king Charles II of England.

Cast
 Lionelle Howard as Leonard Holt  
 R. Juden as Annabel  
 P.G. Ebbutt as King Charles  
 J. Cooper as Solomon Eagle  
 Ivan Cleveland as Earl of Rochester  
 Maud Sinclair as Nurse Malmayne  
 F.J.J. Hart as Chowles 
 Cyril Smith as Boy

References

Bibliography
 Low, Rachael. The History of British Film, Volume III: 1914-1918. Routledge, 1997.

External links
 

1914 films
1914 drama films
1910s historical drama films
British drama short films
British historical drama films
British silent short films
Films directed by Wilfred Noy
Films based on British novels
Films set in London
Films set in the 1660s
British black-and-white films
Cultural depictions of Charles II of England
1910s English-language films
1910s British films
Silent historical drama films